Boulder is a town in Garfield County, Utah, United States, 27 miles (44 km) northeast of Escalante on Utah Scenic Byway 12 at its intersection with the Burr Trail.  As of the 2010 census, the town population was 226, an increase of nearly 26% over the 2000 figure of 180.

Boulder, quite isolated until the Civilian Conservation Corps built a road from Escalante, did not get electric power until 1947. The town marks the western terminus of Burr Trail, a mostly paved road that runs eastward through spectacular red rock country to the Waterpocket Fold in Capitol Reef National Park.  Boulder is the home of Anasazi Indian State Park.

Geography

Boulder is near Grand Staircase–Escalante National Monument and Capitol Reef National Park.

According to the United States Census Bureau, the town has a total area of 20.9 square miles (54.2 km2), all land. Boulder also has many sandstone formations, such as small mountains and slopes.

Trails and byways

The American Discovery Trail bicycle alternate route runs through Boulder.

Climate
According to the Köppen Climate Classification system, Boulder has a semi-arid climate, abbreviated "BSk" on climate maps.

Demographics

As of the census of 2000, there were 180 people, 65 households, and 41 families residing in the town. The population density was 8.6 people per square mile (3.3/km2). There were 102 housing units at an average density of 4.9 per square mile (1.9/km2). The racial makeup of the town was 96.67% White, 1.11% Asian, 0% African American, 0% Native American, 0% Pacific Islander, 0% from other races, and 2.22% from two or more races. Hispanic or Latino of any race were 1.11% of the population.

There were 65 households, out of which 33.8% had children under 18 living with them, 52.3% were married couples living together, 4.6% had a female householder with no husband present, and 36.9% were non-families. 27.7% of all households were made up of individuals, and 9.2% had someone living alone who was 65 years of age or older. The average household size was 2.77, and the average family size was 3.54.

In the town, the population was spread out, with 30.0% under 18, 11.1% from 18 to 24, 26.7% from 25 to 44, 21.1% from 45 to 64, and 11.1% who were 65 years of age or older. The median age was 34 years. For every 100 females, there were 104.5 males. For every 100 females aged 18 and over, there were 103.2 males.

The median income for a household in the town was $30,000, and the median income for a family was $31,429. Males had a median income of $20,750 versus $12,083 for females. The per capita income for the town was $9,583. About 15.2% of families and 13.3% of the population were below the poverty line, including 6.5% of those under eighteen and 14.3% of those 65 or over.

References

External links

 Official Town Website
 History from a Bureau of Land Management website
 History from the Boulder Business Alliance website

Towns in Utah
Towns in Garfield County, Utah
Populated places established in 1890